Khukha is a village in Jhelum District, Punjab, Pakistan. It is a Union Council, an administrative subdivision, of Jhelum Tehsil and is a "model" village. It lies 7 km west of Dina,1 km east of Gaggar Khurd , 5 km north of Rohtas and  10 km north east of Tilla Jogian. Neighbouring villages of khukha include Natain, Khojki and Mota Gharbi.

The historical Grand Trunk Road (before the British made the tarmac road) runs from north to south on the west side of the village leading to Rohtas and then onto Jhelum.  There is a Bavali (deep water well) made by the Mughals on this route about 1 km to the north west of the village.  There is now a new water supply which uses a new bore-hole (located near Baba Sher Shah's darbar) from where water is pumped to the new water tank (located near the Jamia Masjid) and water is supplied to almost the entire village.

References

External links 
 Khukha

Populated places in Tehsil Jhelum
Union councils of Jhelum Tehsil